Serans is a former commune in the Orne department in north-western France. On 1 January 2016, it was merged into the new commune of Écouché-les-Vallées.

See also
 Communes of the Orne department
Château de la Motte, Joué du Plain

References

Former communes of Orne